Thiri Thu Yadana Dewi, commonly known as Princess of Mingin or Mingin Supaya, was a high-ranking Burmese royal princess during the late Konbaung dynasty.

Life 
Thiri Thu Yadana Wadi (later promoted to Thiri Thu Yadana Dewi) was born to King Mindon and Magway Mibaya at Mandalay Palace. She was, at first, received the appanage of Lè Gaing which was replaced with the town of Mingin in April 1861. The ear-boring ceremony for Mingin Supaya was held on 6 February 1868. After King Thibaw ascended the throne, she, along with other princesses, was administered to take an oath of loyalty on 18 November 1878.

Mingin Supaya, together with Momeik Princess, was granted an opportunity to feed Hteik Su Myat Phaya Gyi (first daughter of King Thibaw and Queen Supayalat) at her royal cradling ceremony held on 22 February 1883.

Death 
Mingin Supaya was found guilty of having sexual relationship with a man named Nga Tu and was ordered to be imprisoned for violating social taboos concerning sex on 22 April 1883. On the following day, her family and its servants were sent as slaves to Man Aung Yadana Wakhingone Pagoda. On 25 April 1883, at sayadaws' request, she was sentenced in jail, and others were set free but remained under house arrest until the abdication of King Thibaw in 1885.

Mingin Supaya was executed on 26 April 1884 at 6:00 pm.

References

Bibliography 
 

1884 deaths
Konbaung dynasty
Burmese princesses